The foxglove pug (Eupithecia pulchellata) is a moth of the family Geometridae found in Europe. It was described by the English entomologist James Francis Stephens in 1831.

Description
The wingspan is 18–22 mm and the species is quite colourful for the genus, with alternating bands of dark brown and buffish orange on the forewings. In some races the buff bands can be very pale. There are dark crosslines. The hindwings are similarly marked but generally paler. It flies at night in May and June and is attracted to light.

The larva is quite variable but is normally yellowish-green with purplish markings. It usually feeds inside foxglove flowers (Digitalis species). After hatching the larva bores through the side of the flower, sealing the mouth with silk and feeding on the reproductive parts of the flower, i.e. the stamen and developing seeds. Larva can be found from June to August by searching for discoloured flowers. The pupa overwinters in the soil, lasting through the winter to May and June. The corolla of the flower can persist on a plant long after uninfested flowers have fallen. Somewhat surprisingly, given this very specialized feeding ecology, it has also been recorded feeding on Brassica oleracea in Malta. The species overwinters as a pupa. The preferred habitat is the edge of woods, glades and park landscapes, gardens and warm mountain slopes.

Subspecies
Eupithecia pulchellata pulchellata
Eupithecia pulchellata grisearia Schwingenschuss, 1939
Eupithecia pulchellata hebudium Sheldon, 1899
Eupithecia pulchellata intermedia Dietze, 1913

Distribution
It has a scattered distribution across Europe, closely following the range of its food plant. Where present it can be very common. The nominate subspecies E. pulchellata pulchellata is found in the British Isles, in Central Europe the subspecies is E. pulchellata intermedia. In the Pyrenees, it occurs to a height of 2,400 metres.

References

Chinery, Michael Collins Guide to the Insects of Britain and Western Europe 1986 (Reprinted 1991)
Skinner, Bernard Colour Identification Guide to Moths of the British Isles 1984

External links
Foxglove Pug at UKMoths
Lepiforum e.V.

Eupithecia
Moths described in 1831
Moths of Europe
Taxa named by James Francis Stephens